Mavuka is a town in eastern Lesotho, close to the border with South Africa. It lies close to the Drakensberg, and is connected to both South Africa and the Lesotho towns of Matebeng and Paolosi by twisting mountain roads.

References
Fitzpatrick, M., Blond, B., Pitcher, G., Richmond, S., and Warren, M. (2004) South Africa, Lesotho and Swaziland. Footscray, VIC: Lonely Planet.

Populated places in Lesotho